Dominic Lesley Daniels (born 8 January 1992) is a South African cricketer who played several matches for Boland between 2009 and 2011. A right-handed batsman and right-arm off break bowler, he made his first-class debut on 20 December 2009 against Easterns.

References
Dominic Daniels profile at CricketArchive

1992 births
Living people
Cricketers from Paarl
South African cricketers
Boland cricketers